Lyman Tremain (June 14, 1819, in Durham, Greene County, New York – November 30, 1878, in New York City) was a jurist and politician from New York.

Biography 
He was admitted to the bar in 1840 and practiced in Durham, where he was elected to his first political office as town supervisor in 1842.  He was appointed District Attorney of Greene County in 1844. He was elected Surrogate in 1846, but lost reelection in 1851.

He moved to Albany, New York in 1853 and entered into partnership with former Congressman Rufus Wheeler Peckham in 1855. Elected as a Democrat, he was New York State Attorney General from January 1, 1858, to December 31, 1859.

He ran unsuccessfully as the Republican candidate for Lieutenant Governor of New York in 1862.  In June 1864 he was a delegate to the Baltimore Convention of the National Union Party where he placed the name of Daniel S. Dickinson in contention for the vice presidential nomination on the ticket with President Lincoln. He served as a member of the New York State Assembly in 1866, and was elected Speaker. He was a delegate to the 1868 Republican National Convention and placed Governor Fenton's name in contention for Vice President on the ticket with General Grant.

In 1872, Tremain was elected as a Republican to the Forty-third United States Congress, defeating the incumbent Samuel Sullivan Cox.  He served from March 4, 1873, to March 3, 1875, and then did not seek reelection.  In 1873, Tremain also served with his partner's oldest son, Wheeler Hazard Peckham, as special counsel to the State in the prosecution of Boss Tweed.  After leaving Congress, Tremain returned to private legal practice in Albany and then died in New York City while visiting.  He was buried in Albany Rural Cemetery in Menands, New York.

Tremain's son Frederick Lyman (June 1843 – February 6, 1865) was a lieutenant colonel of the 10th New York Cavalry during the Civil War who was killed at the Battle of Hatcher's Run.

Notes

References

 The Political Graveyard
 List of New York Attorneys General, at Office of the NYSAG
Trial of William M. Tweed from Celebrated Trials by Henry Lauren Clinton, 1897.

1819 births
1878 deaths
New York (state) state court judges
New York State Attorneys General
Speakers of the New York State Assembly
Democratic Party members of the New York State Assembly
Burials at Albany Rural Cemetery
People from Durham, New York
Republican Party members of the United States House of Representatives from New York (state)
19th-century American politicians
19th-century American judges